Sarkhun Rural District is a rural district (dehestan) in the Qaleh Qazi District of Bandar Abbas County, Hormozgan Province, Iran. At the 2006 census, its population was 5,184, in 1,197 families.  The rural district has 6 villages.

References 

Rural Districts of Hormozgan Province
Bandar Abbas County